Tulpar is a winged or swift horse in Turkic mythology (for example, Kazakh and Tatar mythology), similar to Pegasus. Tulpar is also in state emblems of Kazakhstan and Bashkortostan.

Tulpar came to be due to the hunting lifestyle of the people of Central Asia. The people hunted with horses, with the company of a bird of prey. These two animals, with the human imagination, formed into one creating the winged horse known as Tulpar.

This mythical creature has also been used as state symbols of Kazakhstan, the emblem of which is decorated with two golden Tulpars, the top of a yurt (the yurt is a traditional tent where the Kazakhs lived) and the sun rays. The blue background represents the sky where the Tulpars run.

Tulpar is the legendary horse that appears in culture of Turkic-speaking nations (Turks, Uzbeks, Kazakhs, Kyrgyz, etc.).  
The association of a bird with a horse can also be changed to that of a sight hound. A picture of a sight hound coming together with a picture of a legendary horse allowed for the word Tulpar to form, which is the kennel name.
 
The wings were not necessarily for flight but to emphasize their speed. These horses shared their lives with their masters.

See also 
List of fictional horses
Buraq
Tulpar (IFV)
Wind horse, a similar equine in Tibetan mythology
Pegasus
Emblem of Mongolia
Emblem of Kazakhstan
Coat of arms of Bashkortostan

Bibliography 
 Rémy Dor, Contes Kirghiz de la steppe et de la montagne, Publications orientalistes de France, 1983, 166 p.
 Gilles Veinstein, Les Ottomans et la mort, vol. 9 de Ottoman Empire and its heritage, BRILL, 1996, 324 p.
 Hervé Beaumont, Asie centrale: Le guide des civilisations de la route de la soie, Éditions Marcus, 2008, 634 p.

Notes

References

External links
 Статья «Тулпар» в Энциклопедии Башкортостана 
 А. Илимбетова. Культ коня у башкир 

Turkic legendary creatures
Horses in mythology